The 1976 Reading Borough Council election was held on 6 May 1976, at the same time as other local elections across England and Wales. All 46 seats on Reading Borough Council were up for election. The council remained under no overall control, but with the Conservatives becoming the largest party. The Conservative group leader, Deryck Morton, subsequently took the council's most senior political job as chairman of the policy committee, leading a Conservative minority administration.

Ward results
The results in each ward were as follows:

By-elections 19761979

Christchurch by-election 1977

The Christchurch ward by-election in 1977 was triggered by the resignation of Labour councillor John Huntley.

Thames by-election April 1977
On 1 April 1977 the borough was enlarged by the addition of parts of the parishes of Eye and Dunsden, Kidmore End and Mapledurham, all from South Oxfordshire. The number of councillors on Reading Borough Council was increased from 46 to 49 as a result. The two South Oxfordshire district councillors representing much of the transferred area automatically became Reading borough councillors without needing to be re-elected, representing a new ward of Caversham Park. These two were Geoff Lowe and Harold Stoddart, both Liberals (although Lowe later defected to the Conservatives in 1978). Reading's existing Thames and Caversham wards were also enlarged, and the increase in the size of Thames ward justified a fifth councillor being elected for that ward, for which a by-election was held on 21 April 1977, which was won by the Conservatives. After the by-election and two transfers, the balance of the council was 23 Conservatives, 13 Labour and 13 Liberals.

Thames by-election September 1977

The September 1977 by-election was triggered by the death of Conservative councillor Cyril Aucock.

Minster by-election 1977

The Minster ward by-election in 1977 was triggered by the resignation of Conservative councillor Joyce Talbot.

References

1976 English local elections
1976